Kadish is a surname. Notable people with the surname include:

Alan Kadish (born 1956), American cardiologist, academic administrator
Ben-Ami Kadish (1923–2012), U.S. Army mechanical engineer and agent for Israel
George Kadish (1910–1997), Lithuanian photographer
Karl Kadish (born 1945), American chemist
Kevin Kadish (born 1971), American songwriter
Mark J. Kadish, American judge
Mike Kadish (born 1950), American football player
Norman Maurice Kadish (1916–1988), British artist
Reuben Kadish (1913–1992), American artist
Ronald T. Kadish (born 1948), U.S. Air Force general
Sanford Kadish (1921–2014), American criminal law scholar
Sharman Kadish (born 1959), British Jewish historian

See also
Kaddish (disambiguation)